Rizal's 4th congressional district is one of the four congressional districts of the Philippines in the province of Rizal. It has been represented in the House of Representatives since 2022. The district consists of the northern municipality of Rodriguez. It is currently represented in the 19th Congress by Juan Fidel Felipe F. Nograles of Lakas-CMD, who is its first representative since its creation.

Representation history

Election results

2022

See also
 Legislative districts of Rizal

References

Congressional districts of the Philippines
Politics of Rizal
Congressional districts of Calabarzon
2021 establishments in the Philippines
Constituencies established in 2021